Luetkenotyphlus is a genus of caecilians in the family Siphonopidae.

Species recognized (as of October 2019):

References

Siphonopidae
Amphibian genera